Lagurus is a genus of Old World plants in the grass family, native to the Mediterranean Basin and nearby regions, from Madeira and the Canary Islands to Crimea and Saudi Arabia. It is also naturalized in Australia, New Zealand, the Azores, Ireland and Great Britain, and scattered locations in the Americas. The only known species is Lagurus ovatus, commonly called hare's-tail, hare's-tail grass or bunnytail. It is also grown as an ornamental plant for its attractive flower panicles.

Description

Diagnostic features 
 Awns are 8–20 mm
 Leaves and sheaths are softly pubescent
 Panicle measure 1–7 × 0.5–2 cm
 Spikelets are 7–10 mm
 Stems grow erect, up to 60 cm
 Chromosome number is (2n=14)

Distribution 
Native to the Mediterranean and introduced into Britain, it is now thriving on sandy stretches in the islands of Guernsey and Jersey, occasionally found in Ireland and South Wales. It has become naturalized in County Wexford, Ireland, South Devon and West Sussex.

This plant is known or likely to be susceptible to barley mild mosaic bymovirus.

Formerly included species
Species once considered part of Lagurus  but now regarded as better suited to other genera (Cymbopogon, Imperata)
 Lagurus cylindricus – Imperata cylindrica 
 Lagurus paniculatus – Cymbopogon nardus 
 Lagurus schoenanthus – Cymbopogon schoenanthus

References

External links

Pooideae
Grasses of Africa
Grasses of Asia
Grasses of Europe